The Vidovci shooting was a mass shooting that occurred on July 6, 1995, at Vidovci, Požega, Požega-Slavonia County, Slavonia, Croatia. Josip Capan Joko killed 6 members of the Tolić family.

Shooting
On the evening before July 6, 1995, in Vidovci, former legionnaire Josip Capan Joko (44) was arrested for masturbating in front of the Tolić family home. He decided to take revenge for it. On July 6, 1995, Josip Capan shot dead six members of the Tolić family. They were a father, mother, three children and a grandmother. They were all shot in the head. He then detonated an explosive device in their home, killing himself.

References

1995 mass shootings in Europe
Mass shootings in Croatia
1995 crimes in Croatia
1995 in Croatia
Family murders
Murder–suicides in Croatia
1990s murders in Croatia